Rodolfo Gómez Orozco (born 30 October 1950 in Delicias, Chihuahua) is a Mexican retired long-distance runner, who was one of the leading runners represented from Mexico in the 1970s and 1980s. He won the Tokyo Marathon (1981), the IAAF Citizen Golden Marathon in Athens (1982), the Rotterdam Marathon (1982), the Nike OTC Marathon (1982), the Pittsburgh Marathon (1987) and the Mexico City Marathon (1987).  He gained prominence on American television in 1982 when he finished in second place, four seconds back in 2:09:33 while being the primary foil to Alberto Salazar's third victory in a row at the New York Marathon. He ran a personal best of 2:09:12 at the 1983 Tokyo Marathon, finishing third in that race.

Gómez represented Mexico at three consecutive Summer Olympics, starting in 1976. Later on he became an athletics coach, guiding runners like Andrés Espinosa, Germán Silva, Benjamín Paredes, Adriana Fernández, Isaac García, Martín Pitayo, and Isidro Rico.

Achievements

References

External links
 
 

1950 births
Living people
Mexican male long-distance runners
Athletes (track and field) at the 1976 Summer Olympics
Athletes (track and field) at the 1980 Summer Olympics
Athletes (track and field) at the 1984 Summer Olympics
Athletes (track and field) at the 1975 Pan American Games
Athletes (track and field) at the 1979 Pan American Games
Athletes (track and field) at the 1983 Pan American Games
Olympic athletes of Mexico
Pan American Games gold medalists for Mexico
Pan American Games silver medalists for Mexico
Pan American Games bronze medalists for Mexico
Pan American Games medalists in athletics (track and field)
Central American and Caribbean Games gold medalists for Mexico
Competitors at the 1978 Central American and Caribbean Games
Central American and Caribbean Games medalists in athletics
Medalists at the 1975 Pan American Games
Medalists at the 1979 Pan American Games
Sportspeople from Chihuahua (state)
People from Delicias, Chihuahua
20th-century Mexican people